Nojel Imani Eastern (born May 26, 1999) is an American professional basketball player who is currently a Rayos de Hermosillo in Mexico. After playing college basketball for three seasons with the Purdue Boilermakers, he transferred to Howard University before ultimately opting out of the season, then entered the 2021 NBA draft, but was not selected.

Early life
Eastern's first name, Nojel, is an ananym of his father's name, Lejon. He was raised by his mother, Tamala Reed, who worked for the Chicago Transit Authority. Eastern had attention deficit hyperactivity disorder since his youth. Even though his mother worked in Chicago, he attended school in Evanston, Illinois due to the district's superior academics. From fourth to eighth grade, Eastern lived with Travis Ransom, a family friend.

High school career
Eastern played four years of varsity basketball for Evanston Township High School in Evanston. As a sophomore, he averaged 15.7 points, 5.3 rebounds and three assists per game, leading his team to the Central Suburban League South championship and a Class 4A regional title. In April 2015, Eastern dislocated his left ankle and fractured two bones in it during an Amateur Athletic Union game, before undergoing surgery. In his junior season, he averaged 14.9 points, 6.5 rebounds and four assists per game, helping Evanston Township win Central Suburban South and Class 4A regional titles. As a senior, Eastern averaged 15.6 points, 7.1 rebounds and 4.2 assists per game and was named Pioneer Press All-Area Player of the Year. He was the runner-up to Mark Smith for the Illinois Mr. Basketball award.

Recruiting
On November 16, 2016, Eastern committed to play college basketball for Purdue over offers from Michigan State, Ohio State, DePaul and Seton Hall, among others. He was drawn to Purdue because of its coaching staff and its proximity. Eastern was considered a consensus four-star recruit by major recruiting services.

College career

As a freshman at Purdue, Eastern averaged 2.9 points, 2.5 rebounds and 1.1 assists per game in the role of a defensive specialist off the bench. After the season, he declared for the 2018 NBA draft without hiring an agent, before withdrawing from the draft. On March 9, 2019, Eastern scored a career-high 15 points in a 70–57 win over Northwestern. In his sophomore season, he became a regular starter and averaged 7.5 points, a team-high 5.5 rebounds, 2.5 assists and 1.1 steals per game, earning Big Ten Conference All-Defensive honors. Eastern became the first Purdue point guard to lead the team in rebounding since at least 1954. By the time he was a junior, he became Purdue's top defender, with the ability to guard all five positions. As a junior, Eastern averaged 4.9 points, four rebounds and 2.7 assists per game, earning Big Ten All-Defensive accolades for a second time. He led his team in assists and steals. Following the season, he declared for the 2020 NBA draft. 

On May 12, 2020, Eastern announced that he would transfer from Purdue. Two days later, he committed to Michigan for his senior season. However, on June 17, Eastern announced that he would not play for Michigan after he was unable to clear the admission to the school. On August 6, 2020, Eastern committed to continue his career at Howard. Before playing a game, he quit the team on January 3, 2021 to pursue a professional career and train for the 2021 NBA draft.

Professional career
Eastern joined the Long Island Nets for training camp after a successful tryout. However, he was waived on October 27.

In March 10, 2023, Eastern debut at Hermosillo with Rayos de Hermosillo. Actually plays Circuito de Baloncesto de la Costa del Pacífico.

National team career
Eastern and his Purdue teammates represented the United States at the 2017 Summer Universiade in Taipei. He averaged 5.6 points, 2.4 rebounds and 2.4 assists in 14.5 minutes per game, helping his team win the silver medal.

Career statistics

College

|-
| style="text-align:left;"| 2017–18
| style="text-align:left;"| Purdue
| 37 || 0 || 12.6 || .483 || .333 || .417 || 2.5 || 1.1 || .6 || .1 || 2.9
|-
| style="text-align:left;"| 2018–19
| style="text-align:left;"| Purdue
| 36 || 35 || 28.2 || .495 || .000 || .650 || 5.5 || 2.5 || 1.1 || .3 || 7.5
|-
| style="text-align:left;"| 2019–20
| style="text-align:left;"| Purdue
| 31 || 27 || 25.5 || .420 || .000 || .485 || 4.0 || 2.7 || 1.1 || .2 || 4.9
|- class="sortbottom"
| style="text-align:center;" colspan="2"| Career
| 104 || 62 || 21.8 || .466 || .188 || .558 || 4.0 || 2.0 || .9 || .2 || 5.1

References

External links
Purdue Boilermakers bio
USA Basketball bio

1999 births
Living people
American men's basketball players
Basketball players from Chicago
Medalists at the 2017 Summer Universiade
Purdue Boilermakers men's basketball players
Point guards
Shooting guards
Universiade silver medalists for the United States
Universiade medalists in basketball